Cheryl Fergison (born 27 August 1965) is an English actress. She is known for portraying the role of Heather Trott in the BBC soap opera EastEnders a role in which she starred in from 2007 until 2012.

Career
After training at Rose Bruford College, Fergison started playing the role of Heather Trott on the BBC soap opera EastEnders on 26 June 2007. The character was conceived by the former executive producer, Diederick Santer. Prior to this, Fergison made a brief appearance on the series as a friend of Mo Harris (Laila Morse) in 2005.

Fergison's stage credits include Measure for Measure, for the Royal Shakespeare Company and the 2006 season at The Scoop.

Fergison is also known for playing Joanna Harding in the Linda Flint sketches of Little Britain, opposite David Walliams and also played Judy in The IT Crowd. Other notable appearances include 'Allo 'Allo!, Little Miss Jocelyn, Bad Girls and Casualty, as well as playing Mrs. Lloyd in two episodes of Doctor Who, "The Empty Child" and "The Doctor Dances". Fergison also starred in a promotional video for the band Keane's single "Atlantic", which was included on their Under the Iron Sea DVD.

In November 2007, Fergison participated in the Children in Need charity appeal with her EastEnders co-stars which was broadcast on BBC One. On 26 June 2008, she appeared on and won an EastEnders special of quiz show The Weakest Link.

Since appearing on EastEnders, Fergison has made a variety of television appearances on shows such as GMTV, The Paul O'Grady Show, This Morning and Loose Women. She won the Best Comedy Performance award at the 2008 Inside Soap Awards, and was then nominated for Best Comedy Performance and Best Onscreen Partnership Award (alongside Linda Henry) at the 2008 British Soap Awards. Fergison later appeared in Let's Dance For Sport Relief, dancing to "Ice Ice Baby" by Vanilla Ice, and appeared in an episode of BBC Two's Shooting Stars in August 2010.

On 17 September 2011, Fergison was axed from EastEnders and it was announced that she would leave at the end of her current contract, departing the show on 21 March 2012. Heather was killed off after being hit with a photoframe by Ben Mitchell (Joshua Pascoe).

In March 2012, Fergison appeared on The Saturday Night Show. In April and June 2012, Fergison made two guest panellist appearances on ITV's Loose Women. On 15 August 2012, Fergison entered the Celebrity Big Brother 10 house. On 24 August 2012, she became the second housemate to be evicted.

Fergison was one of the celebrity contestants on Your Face Sounds Familiar. During the series, she sang as Dusty Springfield, Anastacia, Meatloaf, Lulu, Madonna, Cher and Adele. She played the role of Jo in the 2014 series of Big School on BBC One.
On 24 December 2016, Fergison reprised her role on EastEnders as Heather Trott, in the form of a recorded voice-over. In the recording, Heather gushed about how Christmas wasn't Christmas "without a bit of George Michael".

From October to November 2018, she played the part of Mrs Bird in the musical production of Maggie May at the Royal Court Theatre in Liverpool.

In 2022, she played a fictionalised version of herself in Catherine Tate's six-part mockumentary sitcom Hard Cell, released on Netflix.

Personal life 

Fergison divorced her husband, Jamshed Saddiqi, in 2008. She and Saddiqi have one child, a son named Alex. In May 2011, Fergison married Yassine Al-Jermoni.

Filmography

As an Actress

As Herself

Theatre Credits

References

External links

English soap opera actresses
Royal Shakespeare Company members
English Shakespearean actresses
Living people
1965 births
Actresses from London
Alumni of Rose Bruford College